Racing Demon may refer to:

 Racing Demon (play), by David Hare
 Racing Demon (card game), a fast-paced card game also known as Nerts